Michael Matthew Moroney (6 December 1933 – 15 March 2015) was an Australian athlete. He competed in the men's long jump at the 1956 Summer Olympics.

References

1933 births
2015 deaths
Athletes (track and field) at the 1956 Summer Olympics
Australian male long jumpers
Olympic athletes of Australia
Place of birth missing